Satpokharee is a village in the Mathagadi Gaunpalika (माथागढी गाउँपालिका) Gothadi ward no. 6 Palpa District in the Lumbini Province of southern Nepal. Population of 200 people living in 40 individual households.

Geography

Satpokharee is 25.6 km south-east of the headquarters city Tansen. The valley is bounded by Rahabas V.D.C. in the east, Gothadi in the south and Jhadewa V.D.C. in the north. The popular River Jhumsa khola connects with the Thadekhola (Rahabskhola) orgn.source started in northern part.

Development

Ncell the country's largest private GSM mobile service provider, Ncell & other GSM mobile service provider multiple company has installed mobile tower using a solar power to operate its Base Transceiver Station (BTS) towers under its ‘Going Green’ scheme on 1 years ago at Nyaurikot Hill (Rehadi-Kerauli Jhadewa) north-east of valley. 
Now approximately 90% peoples are using a cellphone in the valley. even farmers & housewife....engaged in mobile!!!. yes we can say that valley is going through changes.....

Tourism
The village is top of the hills on all sides.the view of mountain Dhaulagiri and Annapurna has added more beauty to Satpokharee. but now The existence of the village is almost over now!!! because all the surrounding villages, including Satpokhari, are made of argillaceous rock mount, so the local government of Nepal demanded that it be given to the cement industry. now Palpa cement and other cement company is using as a stone quarry. half of village.

Education
Due to the inconvenience of drinking water and the inconvenience of school, many new generations have been forced to leave the village.
Elementary schools also have to walk 45 minutes uphill and downhill to get drinking water. So many new generations are forced to be displaced.
Mr. Pomlal Sunar, a man who was forced to leave the village out of concern for his children's education, managed to get his daughter to graduate.

Miss Parvati Sunar is the first person to study till graduation from Tribhuvan University palpa. Otherwise 
no one has just passed 10 + 2.

Populated places in Palpa District